Babington Path is a street in Mid-Levels, Hong Kong Island spanning from the junction between Bonham Road, St. Stephen's Lane and Park Road to Robinson Road. The street is intersected by Lyttelton Road.

Features
There are two restaurants along the road, one being a dessert shop (糖痴豆) and the other being a noodle shop Chi Kei (枝記麵家). The other places along the road are residential dwellings, an artisan coffee shop, and there are also multiple tutorial centres along the road.

See also
 1972 Hong Kong landslides
 List of streets and roads in Hong Kong

External links
 

Mid-Levels
Sai Ying Pun
Roads on Hong Kong Island